Florence-Graham (locally known as Florence-Firestone) is an unincorporated community in Los Angeles County. The population was 61,983 at the 2020 census, down from 63,387 at the 2010 census. The census area includes separate communities of Florence, Firestone Park, and Graham. It is located in the south central region of Los Angeles County. The neighboring communities are Central-Alameda, Florence, Green Meadows, Lynwood, South Gate, South Park, Vernon, Walnut Park and Watts.

Geography

Demographics

2010
At the 2010 census Florence-Graham had a population of 63,387. The racial makeup of Florence-Graham was 23,896 (37.8%) white (0.7% non-Hispanic white), 5,862 (9.3%) African American, 498 (0.8%) Native American, 150 (0.2%) Asian, 25 (0.0%) Pacific Islander, 30,704 (48.4%) from other races, and 2,254 (3.6%) from two or more races. Hispanic or Latino of any race were 57,066 persons (90.0%).

The census reported that 63,317 people (99.9% of the population) lived in households, 70 (0.1%) lived in non-institutionalized group quarters, and no one was institutionalized.

There were 13,900 households, 9,191 (66.1%) had children under the age of 18 living in them, 7,058 (50.8%) were opposite-sex married couples living together, 3,459 (24.9%) had a female householder with no husband present, 1,665 (12.0%) had a male householder with no wife present.  There were 1,405 (10.1%) unmarried opposite-sex partnerships, and 84 (0.6%) same-sex married couples or partnerships. 1,178 households (8.5%) were one person and 421 (3.0%) had someone living alone who was 65 or older. The average household size was 4.56.  There were 12,182 families (87.6% of households); the average family size was 4.63.

The population was spread out, with 22,198 people (35.0%) under the age of 18, 7,990 people (12.6%) aged 18 to 24, 18,758 people (29.6%) aged 25 to 44, 11,020 people (17.4%) aged 45 to 64, and 3,421 people (5.4%) who were 65 or older.  The median age was 26.3 years. For every 100 females, there were 100.2 males.  For every 100 females age 18 and over, there were 99.2 males.

There were 14,765 housing units at an average density of 4,123.9 per square mile, of the occupied units 5,101 (36.7%) were owner-occupied and 8,799 (63.3%) were rented. The homeowner vacancy rate was 2.9%; the rental vacancy rate was 4.5%.  25,014 people (39.5% of the population) lived in owner-occupied housing units and 38,303 people (60.4%) lived in rental housing units.

According to the 2010 United States Census, Florence-Graham had a median household income of $35,543, with 30.7% of the population living below the federal poverty line.

2000
At the 2000 census there were 60,197 people, 13,354 households, and 11,617 families in the CDP. The population density was 16,799.7 inhabitants per square mile (6,492.2/km). The racial makeup of the CDP was 24.55% White, 13.14% Black or African American, 0.98% Native American, 0.12% Asian, 0.09% Pacific Islander, 56.40% from other races, and 4.73% from two or more races.  85.90%. was Hispanic or Latino of any race.

Of the 13,354 households, 60.7% had children under the age of 18 living with them, 54.2% were married couples living together, 22.7% had a female householder with no husband present, and 13.0% were non-families. 10.2% of households were one person, and 4.6% were one person aged 65 or older.  The average household size was 4.51 and the average family size was 4.71.

The age distribution was 40.0% under the age of 18, 12.9% from 18 to 24, 29.8% from 25 to 44, 12.4% from 45 to 64, and 4.9% 65 or older.  The median age was 24 years. For every 100 females, there were 101.7 males.  For every 100 females age 18 and over, there were 99.9 males.

The median household income was $25,425 and the median family income was $25,824. Males had a median income of $19,400 versus $16,496 for females. The per capita income for the CDP was $8,092.  About 34.1% of families and 35.8% of the population were below the poverty line, including 43.4% of those under age 18 and 23.6% of those ages 65 or over.

Education

Primary and secondary schools
Florence-Graham residents are zoned to Los Angeles Unified School District schools.

Zoned elementary schools within the CDP include:
 Russell Elementary School
 Florence Avenue Elementary School
 Graham Elementary School
 Lillian St. Elementary School
 Miramonte Elementary School
 Parmelee Elementary School

Zoned middle schools within the CDP include:
 Charles Drew Middle School
 Thomas A. Edison Middle School
 Kory Hunter Middle School

Residents are zoned to John C. Fremont High School in Los Angeles. Some sections are jointly zoned to Fremont and Jordan High School in Los Angeles.

The Roman Catholic Archdiocese of Los Angeles operates the St. Aloysius School (PK, 1-8) and the St. Malachy School (K-8) in Florence-Graham.

Public libraries
County of Los Angeles Public Library operates the Florence Library and the Graham Library.

The Florence Library opened in 1914 at the residence of Fred W. Cleland. On June 30, 1915, the library moved to Florence Avenue Elementary School. In 1920 the library moved to a building with a converted stable. The library moved to another location in 1924. In 1931-1932 the library moved to a storefront location. In 1964 the storefront was refurbished to mark the 50th anniversary of the library. The library moved to its current location in 1970. The library was refurbished beginning in December 2001, and it reopened in 2002.

The Graham Library opened in April 1915 in a school. Two years later the library moved to a store building. In 1928 the library moved to another building. In 1938 the library moved another time. The current location was built in 1969. The library was refurbished beginning in May 2000. The library reopened in November 2001 and was rededicated on the 8th of that month. The library has murals from the Bolivian artist Mario Cespedes.

Government

Infrastructure
Fire protection in Florence is provided by the Los Angeles County Fire Department with ambulance transport by Care Ambulance Service.

The Los Angeles County Sheriff's Department (LASD) operates the Century Station in Lynwood, serving the CDP.

The Los Angeles County Department of Health Services operates the South Health Center in Los Angeles, serving Florence Graham.

The Los Angeles County Sheriff's Department (LASD) operates the Century Station in Lynwood, serving Florence in Florence-Graham.

Parks and recreation
Mary M. Bethune Park, operated by the county, is within the CDP. The park includes a baseball/softball field, a basketball court, children's play areas, a community recreation room, a gymnasium, a multi-purpose field, picnic tables and barbecue grills, a skateboard park, a swimming pool, and toilets.

Franklin D. Roosevelt Park, also operated by the county, is within the CDP. In terms of county facilities it is among the oldest; the construction of the park was authorized by President of the United States Franklin D. Roosevelt as part of the Works Progress Administration projects during the Great Depression. The park has basketball courts, children's play areas, a community room, a computer center, a fitness zone, a gymnasium, picnic shelters, a senior center, a soccer field, a swimming pool, a skateboard park and tennis courts.

Colonel Leon H. Washington Park, another county park, is within the CDP. The  park is located on a plot of land that was formerly a lumber yard. It was named after Colonel Leon H. Washington, the founder of The Eastside Shopper (now The Sentinel). The facility has a children's play area, a community recreation center, a computer room, gymnasium, picnic areas with barbecue grills, a swimming pool, tennis courts, and toilets.

The  Ted Watkins Memorial Park, a county park, is within the CDP. The park, which is one of many contributions from Watts Labor Community Action Committee (WLCAC) was named after Ted Watkins, the founder of the WLCAC, in 1995. The park has lighted baseball/softball fields, a children's play area, a community recreation room, a computer lab, a gymnasium with a stage, picnic areas, a skateboard park, a soccer (football) field, a swimming pool, tennis courts, and toilets.

References

External links
The Florence-Firestone Chamber of Commerce

Census-designated places in Los Angeles County, California
Gateway Cities
Census-designated places in California